Sir James Hastings Duncan (1 March 1855 – 31 July 1928)  was a British Liberal Party politician.

He was elected at the 1900 general election as Member of Parliament (MP) for the Otley division of the West Riding of Yorkshire, regaining a seat which had been held by Liberals from 1885 until a narrow Conservative victory in 1895.

Duncan held the seat until the constituency was abolished in boundary changes for the 1918 general election, and did not stand for Parliament again.

He was knighted in 1914.

Electoral record

References

External links 
 

1855 births
1928 deaths
Knights Bachelor
Liberal Party (UK) MPs for English constituencies
UK MPs 1900–1906
UK MPs 1910
UK MPs 1910–1918
People from Otley